Heilongjiang Ice City Football Club, previously known as Heilongjiang Lava Spring Football Club, is a professional Chinese football club that participates in the China League One division under licence from the Chinese Football Association (CFA). The team is based in Harbin, Heilongjiang and their home stadium is the Harbin ICE Center Stadium, which has a capacity of 50,000. Their majority shareholder is the Heilongjiang Volcanic Springs Green Natural Mineral Water Co., Ltd.

History
The club was established by Heilongjiang Volcanic Springs Green Natural Mineral Water Co., Ltd. on December 31, 2015, and took over Anhui Litian to participate in China League Two. They appointed Zoran Janković as their head coach, and finished tenth at the end of the 2016 league season. Upon the next season, Duan Xin became the Head coach of the team on December 1, 2016 and he was able to guide the club into not only the play-offs but also surprised the entire league by winning the 2017 China League Two championship, and gaining promotion to China League One for the first time in the team's history.

Name history
2016–2020: Heilongjiang Lava Spring 黑龙江火山鸣泉
2021–: Heilongjiang Ice City 黑龙江冰城

Players

Current squad

Coaching staff

Managerial history
  Zoran Janković (2016)
  Duan Xin (2017 – )

Honours
 China League Two
Champions (1): 2017

Results
All-time league rankings

As of the end of 2019 season.

 in South Group.

Key 
 Pld = Played
 W = Games won
 D = Games drawn
 L = Games lost
 F = Goals for
 A = Goals against
 Pts = Points
 Pos = Final position

 DNQ = Did not qualify
 DNE = Did not enter
 NH = Not Held
 – = Does Not Exist
 R1 = Round 1
 R2 = Round 2
 R3 = Round 3
 R4 = Round 4

 F = Final
 SF = Semi-finals
 QF = Quarter-finals
 R16 = Round of 16
 Group = Group stage
 GS2 = Second Group stage
 QR1 = First Qualifying Round
 QR2 = Second Qualifying Round
 QR3 = Third Qualifying Round

References

 
Football clubs in China
Sport in Harbin
Organizations based in Harbin